The Western Province Rugby League is a semi professional rugby league competition in South Africa. It currently holds 5 teams (not confirmed).

History 
The competition was formed in 2012.

Teams

References

External links 

South Africa Rugby League
Rugby league competitions
Sports leagues established in 2012
2012 establishments in South Africa